Georges Fauvelle (3 March 1891 – 16 December 1962) was a French architect. His work was part of the architecture event in the art competition at the 1928 Summer Olympics.

References

1891 births
1962 deaths
20th-century French architects
Olympic competitors in art competitions
Architects from Paris